Henry Marshall Tory (January 11, 1864 – February 6, 1947) was the first president of the University of Alberta (1908–1928), the first president of the Khaki University, the first president of the National Research Council (1928–1935), and the first president of Carleton College (1942–1947). His brother was James Cranswick Tory, Lieutenant Governor of Nova Scotia (1925–1930).

Overview

Awarded one of McGill University's earliest doctoral degrees in science, Tory did not himself become a researcher but was the principal founder of several universities – University of British Columbia, University of Alberta and Carleton University – and of the Alberta Research Council and the National Research Council.

Early life
Born on a farm near Guysborough, in Guysborough County, Nova Scotia, his mother was a major factor in his educational ambition. At 22, he registered for Honours Mathematics and Physics in 1886 at McGill University and received an Honours B.A. with gold medal in 1890, despite his mother's desire for him to attend Mount Allison University to study Arts and Theology.The New Trail , the University of Alberta’s alumni magazine, pp 188-195, October 1947</ref>

After graduating, he studied theology and received a B.D. from Wesleyan College, affiliated with McGill. He spent the next two years preaching at a church. In 1893, he married Annie Gertrude Frost of Knowlton, Quebec, who has never had any mentions outside of being a good hostess.

Career

Tory became a lecturer in mathematics at McGill University in 1893, and he received an M.A. in Mathematics in 1896. He received a D.Sc. degree in 1903 and was promoted to associate professor of mathematics. In 1906, he set up the McGill University College of British Columbia, which was absorbed into the University of British Columbia in 1915. From 1908 to 1929, he was the first president of the University of Alberta. 
During World War I, Tory, initially somewhat reluctantly, became a colonel in the Canadian Expeditionary Force in 1916. After a tour of the front lines in France, he returned to England and proceeded to set up and run what came to be known as the Khaki University, enrolling over 50,000 Canadian student soldiers by the end of the Great War.

Tory returned to Alberta in 1919 and resumed his position as president of the University of Alberta. Nearing retirement, on June 1, 1928, he accepted an appointment as the first President of the Council and Chief Executive Officer of the National Research Laboratories (which was later called the National Research Council of Canada). From 1939 to 1940, he was president of the Royal Society of Canada, just after his wife's death in 1938. 

From 1942 until his death in 1947, he was the first president of Carleton College (which later became Carleton University).

Legacy

The Henry Marshall Tory Building and the Tory Theatre at the University of Alberta were named in his honour, as was the Tory Building at Carleton University.
The Henry Marshall Tory Medal at the University of British Columbia was established in 1941.

University Histories
 William Hardy Alexander, The University of Alberta: A Retrospect 1908-1929
 Walter Johns, History of the University of Alberta
 John Macdonald, The History of the University of Alberta, 1908-1958
 Scott Rollans Echoes in the Halls: An Unofficial History of the University of Alberta (Association of Professors Emeriti of the U of A, University Of Alberta, 1999)
 Ellen Schoeck, I Was There: A Century of Alumni Stories about the University of Alberta, 1906–2006
 William C. Gibson Wesbrook & His University (Vancouver: University of British Columbia Press)
 George Woodcock & Tim Fitzharris. The University of British Columbia – A Souvenir. (Toronto: Oxford University Press, 1986).
 H. Blair Neatby Creating Carleton: The Shaping of a University (Montreal: McGill-Queen's University Press, October 1, 2002)
 Paul Axelrod Scholars and Dollars: Politics, Economics, and the Universities of Ontario 1945-1980 (Toronto: University of Toronto Press, September 1, 1982)

References

External links

 Henry Marshall Tory Fonds

1864 births
1947 deaths
Canadian mathematicians
Canadian Methodists
Canadian people of Irish descent
Presidents of Carleton University
McGill University alumni
People from Guysborough County, Nova Scotia
Presidents of the University of Alberta
Henry
Persons of National Historic Significance (Canada)